The International Journal of Women's Health is a peer-reviewed healthcare journal focusing  on all aspects of women's health care, including obstetrics, gynecology, and breast cancer. The editor-in-chief is Elie D. Al-Chaer (University of Arkansas for Medical Sciences). The journal is published by Dove Medical Press and it is abstracted and indexed in EMBASE and Scopus.

External links 
 
 Netmode a similar women's magazine
English-language journals
Open access journals
Dove Medical Press academic journals
Obstetrics and gynaecology journals
Publications established in 2009